Nathaniel Harry Phillips (born 21 March 1997) is an English professional footballer who plays as a centre-back for  club Liverpool.

Early life
Phillips was born in Bolton, Greater Manchester.

Career

Early career
In 2016, Phillips left Bolton Wanderers' academy and trained at Huddersfield Town after he secured a scholarship at the University of North Carolina at Charlotte. Two days before his planned flight to the United States, he joined Liverpool's academy instead.

Liverpool
In the summer of 2018 Phillips started to train with Liverpool's first team and became a member of Jürgen Klopp's squad but still played for the reserve team.

VfB Stuttgart loan and Liverpool recall
In 2019, he moved to German second-division club VfB Stuttgart on loan for the season. He made his professional debut for Stuttgart in the first round of the 2019–20 DFB-Pokal, coming on as a half-time substitute for Holger Badstuber in the away match against 3. Liga club Hansa Rostock. Phillips made his first appearance in the 2019–20 2. Bundesliga on 17 August 2019 against FC St. Pauli. On 27 December 2019, Liverpool announced that Phillips would be recalled from his loan on 1 January 2020 because of a defender injury crisis at his parent club. Twelve days later, after making his first team debut for Liverpool on 5 January 2020 in an FA Cup third round match against Everton, he was loaned back to VfB Stuttgart for the remainder of the 2019–20 season.

Return to Liverpool
On 31 October 2020, Phillips made his league debut for the club, starting in Liverpool's 2–1 win over West Ham United. On 10 March 2021, Phillips made his Champions League debut, putting in a man of the match performance in a 2–0 win over RB Leipzig, and helping Liverpool advance to the quarter finals 4–0 on aggregate.

Phillips scored his first goal for the club on 19 May 2021, scoring a headed goal and Liverpool's second of the game during a 3–0 away win over Burnley in the Premier League and with it, another man of the match award. The following season, Phillips played in Liverpool's 2–1 win against AC Milan at the San Siro to complete the Champions League group stage with six wins. Days later it was revealed Phillips suffered a fractured cheekbone during the game. With game-time limited in the 2021-22 season, Nat Phillips admitted to being ready to leave the club in the January transfer window.

AFC Bournemouth (loan)
On 31 January 2022, he joined AFC Bournemouth on loan until the end of the season. Regarding the move, Klopp commented that "he would have loved to have kept him [at Liverpool]" and that he was "incredibly reliable [and a] great figure here at the training ground". He made his debut for the club in the FA Cup, 0–1 loss to non-league side Boreham Wood. Phillips made his league debut for the club, and his first appearance in the Championship, in a 3–1 victory against Birmingham City.

Personal life
Nathaniel is the son of former footballer Jimmy Phillips and played under his management in the Bolton Wanderers academy.

Career statistics

Honours
VfB Stuttgart
2. Bundesliga runner-up: 2019–20

AFC Bournemouth
EFL Championship runner-up: 2021–22

References

External links

Profile at the Liverpool F.C. website

1997 births
Living people
Footballers from Bolton
English footballers
Association football defenders
Bolton Wanderers F.C. players
Liverpool F.C. players
VfB Stuttgart players
AFC Bournemouth players
2. Bundesliga players
Premier League players
English Football League players
English expatriate footballers
Expatriate footballers in Germany
English expatriate sportspeople in Germany
People educated at Bolton School